The Men's time trial H5 road cycling event at the 2016 Summer Paralympics took place on 14 September at Flamengo Park, Pontal. Twelve riders from nine nations competed.

The H5 category is a handcycle class is for cyclists with lower limb disabilities, such as amputation, but more or less full trunk stability.

Results : Men's road time trial H5

References

Men's road time trial H5